Seyyed zaher (also Romanized as Seyyed zāher; also known as Seyyed Z̧āher) is a village in Elhayi Rural District, in the Central District of Ahvaz County, Khuzestan Province, Iran. At the 2006 census, its population was 150, in 32 families.

References 

Populated places in Ahvaz County